Peterborough West was a federal electoral district represented in the House of Commons of Canada from 1867 to 1953. It was located in the province of Ontario. It was created by the British North America Act of 1867 which divided the County of Peterborough was into two ridings. The West Riding consisted of the Townships of South Monaghan (in the County of Northumberland), North Monaghan, Smith, and Ennismore, and the Town of Peterborough.

In 1903, the townships of Cavendish, Galway, Harvey, and the village of Ashburnham were added to the riding. In 1914, the village of Ashburnham was excluded.

In 1924, Peterborough West was defined to consist of the part of the county of Peterborough included in the townships of Galway, Cavendish, Harvey, Ennismore, Smith, Douro, Otanabee and North Monaghan, and that part of the county of Northumberland included in the township of South Monaghan, together with the city of Peterborough. In 1947, South Monaghan was excluded from the riding.

The electoral district was abolished in 1952 when it was merged into Peterborough riding.

Members of Parliament

This riding elected the following members of the House of Commons of Canada:

Election results

|- 
  
|Conservative
|Charles Perry
|align="right"| 681    
 
|Unknown
|J. Gordon 
|align="right"|652    

|-
  
|Liberal
|John Bertram
|align="right"| 735   
  
|Conservative
|William Cluxton
|align="right"|702    
|}

|- 
  
|Liberal
|John Bertram
|align="right"| 892   
 
|Conservative
|William Hepburn Scott
|align="right"|801    
|}

|- 
  
|Liberal–Conservative
|George Hilliard
|align="right"| 1,071    
  
|Liberal
|John Bertram
|align="right"| 874   
|}

|- 
  
|Liberal–Conservative
|George Hilliard
|align="right"| 1,035    
 
|Unknown
|John J. Lundy
|align="right"| 875   
|}

|- 
  
|Conservative
|James Stevenson 
|align="right"| 1,280    
  
|Liberal
|George Albertus Cox
|align="right"|1,264   
|}

|- 
  
|Conservative
|James Stevenson 
|align="right"| 1,447    
  
|Liberal
|Robert Richard Hall
|align="right"|1,215   
|}

|- 
  
|Conservative
|James Kendry 
|align="right"| 1,485    
  
|Liberal
|Robert Richard Hall 
|align="right"|1,166   
 
|Independent
|Robert C. Newman
|align="right"| 622   
|}

|- 
  
|Conservative
|James Kendry
|align="right"|1,750    
  
|Liberal
|Joseph H. McClellan
|align="right"|1,399   
|}

|- 
  
|Liberal
|Robert Richard Hall 
|align="right"| 2,467   
  
|Conservative
|James Kendry
|align="right"|2,280    
|}

|- 
  
|Liberal
|James Robert Stratton 
|align="right"| 2,851   
  
|Conservative
|John Hampden Burnham 
|align="right"| 2,518    
|}

|- 
  
|Conservative
|John Hampden Burnham  
|align="right"|2,944    
  
|Liberal
|James Robert Stratton
|align="right"|2,902   
|}

|- 
  
|Government (Unionist)
|John Hampden Burnham 
|align="right"|6,382   
  
|Opposition (Laurier Liberals)
|Robert Richard Hall 
|align="right"|2,964   
|}

|- 
  
|Liberal
|George Newcombe Gordon
|align="right"| 4,093   
  
|National Liberal and Conservative
|Roland Denne
|align="right"|2,811 
 
|Independent Conservative
|John Hampden Burnham 
|align="right"| 2,595   
 
|United Farmers of Ontario
|James Corbett Campbell
|align="right"|2,319    

|Labour
|Thomas Joseph McMurray
|align="right"| 1,103    
|}

|- 
  
|Liberal
|George Newcombe Gordon 
|align="right"| 6,890   
  
|Conservative
|John Hampden Burnham 
|align="right"|4,732    
|}

|- 
  
|Conservative
|Edward Armour Peck
|align="right"| 9,100    
  
|Liberal
|George Newcombe Gordon   
|align="right"| 7,137   
|}

|- 
  
|Conservative
|Edward Armour Peck 
|align="right"| 8,934    
  
|Liberal
|Joseph James Duffus
|align="right"| 6,825   
|}

|- 
  
|Conservative
|Edward Armour Peck 
|align="right"|9,663    
  
|Liberal
|Joseph James Duffus
|align="right"| 7,902   
|}

|- 
  
|Liberal
|Joseph James Duffus
|align="right"|8,027   
  
|Conservative
|James Fordyce Strickland
|align="right"|6,342    

 
|Co-operative Commonwealth
|Lorna Cotton Thomas
|align="right"| 1,489   
|}

|- 
 
|National Government
|Gordon Fraser 
|align="right"|9,683    
  
|Liberal
|Roland Maxwell Glover
|align="right"| 9,505   
|}

|- 
  
|Progressive Conservative
|Gordon Fraser  
|align="right"| 10,949    
  
|Liberal
|Roland Maxwell Glover
|align="right"| 8,181   
 
|Co-operative Commonwealth
|Lorna Cotton Thomas
|align="right"|2,512   
|}

|- 
  
|Progressive Conservative
|Gordon Fraser 
|align="right"| 10,981    
  
|Liberal
|Aubrey Victor Clapper
|align="right"| 10,738   
 
|Co-operative Commonwealth
|John Howard Miles
|align="right"| 2,804   
|}

See also 

 List of Canadian federal electoral districts
 Past Canadian electoral districts

References

External links 

 Website of the Parliament of Canada

Former federal electoral districts of Ontario